The following contains a list of hill tribes of Thailand. Hill people live in the hills and mountains. There are hill people around the world, many of whom live in stone houses and herd goats, sheep or camelids or have small farms. Thailand  is a country located at the centre of the Indochina peninsula in Southeast Asia. About 75% of the population is ethnically Thai, 14% is of Chinese origin, and 3% is ethnically Malay; the rest belong to minority groups including Mons, Khmers and various hill tribes.

List Hill tribe (Thailand)

Akha
Bisu
Cosung
Dao
Gong
Hanhi
Hani
Hmong
Ikaw
Karen
Karen Bwé
Karen Pwo
Karen Skaw (S'gaw)
Kaw
Lahu
Lawa
Lisaw
Lishaw
Lisu
Lua
Maew
Meo
Miao
Mien
Mong
Muhso
Musor
Mussor
Musur
Myaung
Mpi
Yao
Palaung people
Yau
Yumbri
Yaung

References

 
Ethnic groups in Thailand
Ethnic groups